Acanthosaura bintangensis, the Bukit Larut Mountain horned agamid or Bintang horned tree lizard, is a species of agama found in Malaysia.

References

bintangensis
Reptiles of Malaysia
Reptiles described in 2009
Taxa named by Perry L. Wood
Taxa named by Jesse L. Grismer
Taxa named by Larry Lee Grismer
Taxa named by Nohrayati Ahmad
Taxa named by Aaron M. Bauer